B. J. Hall (born January 27, 1985) is an American football quarterback who is currently a free agent. Hall played college football at Webber International University.

College career
Hall began his college career at Troy State University before transferring to Solano Community College. Upon graduation from Solano, Hall transferred to Webber International University, where he played the 2006 season with the Warriors.

Professional career
Hall has played for a multitude of teams throughout his career, playing with Lehigh Valley Outlawz, New Mexico Wildcats, Dallas Vigilantes, Tampa Bay Storm, Toronto Argonauts, Lakeland Raiders. On April 24, 2014, Hall re-joined the Storm. Hall was reassigned by the Storm on May 23, 2014. He was assigned to the New Orleans VooDoo on May 28, 2014.

References

1985 births
Living people
American football quarterbacks
Canadian football quarterbacks
American players of Canadian football
Troy Trojans football players
Webber International Warriors football players
Tampa Bay Storm players
Dallas Vigilantes players
Iowa Barnstormers players
Toronto Argonauts players
Lakeland Raiders players
Harrisburg Stampede players
New Orleans VooDoo players